is a Japanese joint holding company established in 2011 by animation studios Sanzigen, Ordet, Trigger and Liden Films. They also co-own a part of ENGI, a studio established by Kadokawa in 2018.

Member studios 
 Sanzigen
 Ordet
 Trigger
 Liden Films

Other companies involved in the holding are Galaxy Graphics, Good Smile Company, Max Factory, Bushiroad, Nitroplus and Pixiv.

Ultra Super Anime Time 
In 2015 it was announced that Ultra Super Pictures would be producing a 30-minute anime block called Ultra Super Anime Time, airing on Tokyo MX and BS11 TV channels, starting from July 3, 2015. The block features 3 short-length anime series, of which the following have been announced:

Summer 2015
 Miss Monochrome season 2
 Wooser's Hand-to-Mouth Life season 3
 Wakaba Girl

Fall 2015
 Miss Monochrome season 3
 Hacka Doll the Animation 
 Kagewani

Winter 2016
 Please Tell Me! Galko-chan
 Sekkō Boys
 Tabi Machi Late Show (January only)
 Kono Danshi, Mahou ga Oshigoto Desu. (February only)
 Kanojo to Kanojo no Neko: Everything Flows (March only)

Spring 2016
 Space Patrol Luluco
 Puchimas! Petit Idolmaster (re-broadcast)
 Kagewani season 2

Animated works
A list of works co-produced by Ultra Super Pictures.
Harmonie (2014, animated by Studio Rikka)
Monster Strike (2015–2016, animated by Studio Hibari)
Monster Strike: Mermaid Rhapsody (2016, animated by Studio Hibari)
Monster Strike: An Encore of Continuance- Pandora's Box (2016, animated by Studio Hibari)
Monster Strike: Rain of Memories (2016, animated by Connect)
Monster Strike The Movie (2016, animated by Liden Films)

References

External links 
 Ultra Super Pictures (official) 
 Ultra Super Anime Time (official) 

 
Anime companies
Animation studios in Tokyo
Holding companies of Japan
Entertainment companies established in 2011
Mass media companies established in 2011
Japanese companies established in 2011
Holding companies established in 2011
Suginami